The Alexander B. and Anna Balch Hamilton House is a house located in northwest Portland, Oregon, that is listed on the National Register of Historic Places.

See also
 National Register of Historic Places listings in Northwest Portland, Oregon

References

1890 establishments in Oregon
Houses completed in 1890
Houses on the National Register of Historic Places in Portland, Oregon
Italianate architecture in Oregon
Northwest Portland, Oregon
Portland Historic Landmarks